Thomas Linton Metzger (April 9, 1938 – November 4, 2020) was an American white supremacist, neo-Nazi skinhead leader and Klansman. He founded White Aryan Resistance (WAR), a neo-nazi organization, in 1983. He was a Grand Wizard of the Ku Klux Klan in the 1970s. Metzger voiced strong opposition to immigration to the United States, and was an advocate of the Third Position. He was incarcerated in Los Angeles County, California, and Toronto, Ontario, and was the subject of several lawsuits and government inquiries. He, his son, and WAR were fined $12 million as a result of the murder of Mulugeta Seraw, 28, an Ethiopian student, by skinheads in Portland, Oregon, affiliated with WAR.

Early life
Metzger was born and raised in Indiana. He served in the U.S. Army from 1961 until 1964 when he moved to Southern California to work in the electronics industry. For a short time, he was a member of the right-wing group the John Birch Society, and attended anti-Communist luncheon meetings sponsored by the Douglas Aircraft Corporation. However, he eventually left the group when it rejected his antisemitic views.

By 1968, Metzger had moved to Fallbrook, California, and he supported independent George C. Wallace for President. Metzger stopped paying taxes in the 1970s, and by 1972 his tax protest over the Vietnam War had destroyed his thriving television business but introduced him to other tax protesters who, he said, were "atheist racists, Christian Identity racists, Nazis, all kinds of people."

From 1971 to 1980, Metzger was the pastor of a Christian Identity church.

Ku Klux Klan
During the 1970s, Metzger joined the Knights of the Ku Klux Klan, which was led by David Duke, and he eventually became the Grand Dragon of the State of California. In the summer of 1979, he organized a patrol, the Klan Border Watch, to capture illegal Mexican immigrants south of Fallbrook, California. Metzger's Klan organization also had a security force which was involved in confrontations with Communists and anti-Klan protesters.

Metzger's branch of the Klan split with Duke's organization in 1980 to form the California Knights of the Ku Klux Klan. Also in 1979, he took Greg Withrow of the White Student Union "under his wing", which later became the Aryan Youth Movement (AYM), for youth associated with White Aryan Resistance.

In 1985, Metzger attended a Nation of Islam rally in San Diego, led by Louis Farrakhan. During the rally, he compared America to a "rotting carcass" and praised Farrakhan for "understanding" that Jews are "living off the carcass" and called them "parasites."

Views 

According to Steven Atkins, author of The Encyclopedia of Right-Wing Extremism in Modern American History, Metzger's ideology "differs from other white supremacists by rejecting the basic tenets of the Christian Identity movement because he considers himself to be the champion of the Third Position. The Third Position is a form of racism that is oriented towards attracting the white working class and it is also anti-capitalist in orientation. Metzger believed that the United States should be divided into designated areas for different racial groups except Asian Americans, who should be expelled from the United States." In 1988 Metzger recorded this message on his WAR Hotline: 
"You have reached WAR Hotline. White Aryan Resistance. You ask: What is WAR? We are an openly white-racist movement—Skinheads, we welcome you into our ranks. The federal government is the number one enemy of our race. When was the last time you heard a politician speaking out in favor of white people? [...] You say the government is too big; we can’t organize. Well, by God, the SS did it in Germany, and if they did it in Germany in the thirties, we can do it right here in the streets of America. We need to cleanse this nation of all nonwhite mud-races for the survival of our own people and the generations of our children."

White Aryan Resistance

In 1982 Metzger left the Klan to found a new group, the White American Political Association, a group dedicated to promoting "prowhite" candidates for office. After losing the 1982 California Senate Democratic primary, Metzger abandoned the electoral route and reorganized WAPA as White American Resistance in 1983 and then reorganized it as White Aryan Resistance, to reflect a more "revolutionary" stance.

In 1985 Metzger attended a rally of the Nation of Islam. Despite Metzger's open racism towards blacks, he alleged the two groups had common ground based on their desire for racial separation and their hatred of Jewish people. Metzger and an NOI representative claim Metzger provided information on the alleged violent plans of the Jewish Defense League, a far-right extremist organization. Metzger donated $100 to the Nation of Islam, to which a Nation of Islam representative said, I don`t think that when you give $100 you form an alliance.' 

Metzger made numerous television appearances in addition to hosting his own cable TV public-access television show, Race and Reason. In one of his first cable episodes, Metzger invited the gothic rock band Radio Werewolf onto the show, during which a confused Metzger was given an honorary membership in the band. In November 1988, his son John appeared on an episode of the Geraldo show in which a brawl broke out and Geraldo Rivera's nose was broken. Metzger also appeared on Wally George's Hot Seat show with Irv Rubin, the chairman of the Jewish Defense League, in what was a very contentious debate. The debate ended when Rubin threw water in the face of Metzger. Security intervened and the Anaheim police were called.

Oregon civil trial
The group was eventually bankrupted as the result of a civil lawsuit centered on its involvement in the 1988 murder of Mulugeta Seraw, an Ethiopian man who had moved to the United States to attend college. In 1988, white power skinheads affiliated with WAR were convicted of killing Seraw and sent to prison. Kenneth Mieske said he and the two others killed Seraw "because of his race." Metzger declared that they did a "civic duty" by killing Seraw. Morris Dees and the Southern Poverty Law Center filed a civil suit against him, arguing that WAR influenced Seraw's killers by encouraging their group East Side White Pride to commit violence.

Metzger's trial was held in October of 1990. His decision to represent himself became the source of considerable civic derision through the legal incompetence which he displayed—never more so than when he accepted an option for a new trial judge during the initial stages of the trial in place of the interim appointed judge who he thought was Jewish; only after he had made his decision did he discover that the new judge, Ancer L. Haggerty, was African American.

At the trial, WAR national vice president Dave Mazzella testified about how the Metzgers instructed WAR members to commit violence against minorities. Tom and his son John Metzger were found civilly liable under the doctrine of vicarious liability, in which one can be liable for a tort committed by a subordinate or another person who is taking instructions. The jury returned the largest civil verdict in Oregon history at the time—$12.5 million—against Metzger and WAR. The Metzgers' house was seized, and most of WAR's profits go to paying off the judgment.

Post-Oregon trial
After the trial, Metzger's home was transferred to Seraw's estate for $121,500, while Metzger was allowed to keep $45,000 under California's Homestead Act. The Southern Poverty Law Center and the Anti-Defamation League came up with the $45,000 needed to pay Metzger for the home. Metzger was warned that any damages left in the house would result in a lawsuit, and while he left it in "a mess" with cracked windows, there was no serious damage. As a result of the sale of his home, he was forced to move into an apartment.

In May 1991, Metzger agreed to stop selling T-shirts of Bart Simpson in a Nazi uniform with the words "Pure Nazi Dude" and "Total Nazi Dude". In 1991 he was convicted of burning a cross in 1983, and sentenced to six months in prison and 300 hours of community service by working with minorities. He was released from prison 45 days into his sentence so he could be with his critically ill wife."Klan leader let out of jail to be with critically ill wife," The Gazette (Montreal, Quebec), February 22, 1992 In 1992, Metzger and his son John violated a court order not to leave the country and entered Canada to speak to the Heritage Front. Soon afterwards, he was arrested for violating Canadian immigration laws by entering the country to "promote racial hatred". With his son John, Metzger was jailed for five days for breaking Canadian immigration laws as he had done so "to promote race hatred".

From the early 1990s, Metzger advocated the "lone wolf" method of organization, of which there are many, for white nationalist groups, which states that a person should not outwardly display his/her racist ideology, but must act covertly.

In 2003, Metzger appeared in Louis and the Nazis, a documentary made by Louis Theroux.

Metzger moved to Warsaw, Indiana at some point in the mid-2000s. In 2004, he was the subject in an online article from a San Diego-based periodical that outlined his love of karaoke, sparse white activist action, and bemused feelings over the state of his hoped-for white revolution. On June 2, 2009, agents of the Bureau of Alcohol, Tobacco and Firearms raided Metzger's home. No arrests were made and no information was released on what was found inside his house. Metzger was allowed to leave the premises during the search and stated that address books, compact discs, tapes and computers were seized in the raid. This was connected with two arrested brothers accused of a mail bomb attack injuring a diversity director in Arizona.

Metzger was mandated to make payments to Seraw's family for the remainder of his life. Metzger hosted an Internet radio talk show and by 2018 no longer resided in Indiana, having moved back to California.

Mainstream party politics
Metzger changed political parties several times and sometimes created his own. In 1980, he won the Democratic Party nomination for the U.S. House of Representatives with over 40,000 votes in a San Diego-area district. This forced the Democratic Party to completely disavow his candidacy, and take the unusual step of endorsing his opponent, Republican Clair Burgener. Metzger lost by over 200,000 votes in November 1980 to Burgener in a heavily Republican district.

In 1982 he sought the Democratic Party's senatorial nomination again, running against then-Governor Jerry Brown and author Gore Vidal, winning only 76,000 votes (2.8% of the vote) in the primary.

In 2010, Metzger took out an advertisement in the Warsaw Times-Union, in order to announce his intention to challenge, as an independent, U.S. Representative Mark Souder, a Republican from Indiana's 3rd congressional district.  "I'd go to Washington and get into Congress, and have a fistfight every day," Metzger told a local news station. Metzger did not make it onto the ballot for the election, which was ultimately won by Republican Marlin Stutzman.

Death
He died on November 4, 2020 of Parkinson's disease.

Electoral history

References

Further reading
Morris Dees. Hate on Trial: The Case Against America's Most Dangerous Neo-Nazi. Villard, (February 23, 1993)  (280 pages)
Elinor Langer. A Hundred Little Hitlers: The Death of a Black Man, the Trial of a White Racist, and the Rise of the Neo-Nazi Movement in America.'' New York: Henry Holt, 2003.

External links
White Aryan Resistance – WAR official site
Video clip of 2014 interview with Metzger by biracial director and filmmaker  Mo Asumang  for her documentary The Aryan
Tom Metzger  list on Southern Poverty Law Center's "40 to watch"
 Christopher Hitchens interviews John Metzger in studio (and Tom Metzger by phone) in 1991: Video Part One and Part Two and Part Three

1938 births
20th-century far-right politicians in the United States
American Holocaust deniers
American neo-Nazis
California Democrats
California Independents
Crime in Oregon
Crime in Toronto
Criminals from California
Criminals from Indiana
Criminals from Nevada
Anti-immigration activists
Indiana Independents
Ku Klux Klan Grand Dragons
2020 deaths
People deported from Canada
People from Warsaw, Indiana
People from Fallbrook, California
Military personnel from Indiana
United States Army soldiers
John Birch Society members
Neurological disease deaths in California
Deaths from Parkinson's disease
American people of German descent
American anti-communists
Neo-Nazi politicians in the United States
Ku Klux Klan in California